Resistance, in psychoanalysis, refers to the client's defence mechanisms that emerge from unconscious content coming to fruition through process. Resistance is the repression of unconscious drives from integration into conscious awareness.

Sigmund Freud, the founder of psychoanalytic theory, developed his concept of resistance as he worked with patients who suddenly developed uncooperative behaviors during sessions of talk therapy. He reasoned that an individual that is suffering from a psychological affliction, which Freud believed to be derived from the presence of suppressed illicit or unwanted thoughts, may inadvertently attempt to impede any attempt to confront a subconsciously perceived threat. This would be for the purpose of inhibiting the revelation of any repressed information from within the unconscious mind.

History 
Having developed the theory of resistance through his direct experiences with patients undergoing therapy, Sigmund Freud noticed that patients would avoid subjects and topics that struck too closely to uncomfortable memories or unacceptable emotions and desires. Freud then integrated these findings with his previous theories concerning the functions of the id, ego and super-ego. As a result, he eventually advanced his concept of resistance by developing it into a multitude of individual forms that included repression, transference, ego-resistance, "working-through", and self-sabotage.

The common theory behind many of Sigmund Freud's psychoanalytic techniques, alluding to the fundamentals of psychoanalysis as a science, was that it is possible that memories that have been lost from consciousness provide hints of their existence by the means of prompting certain thoughts and behaviors. Accordingly, the aim of psychoanalysis is to bring what is unconscious or preconscious into consciousness through verbalization. Afterwards, the act of bringing such thoughts into consciousness prevents them from motivating behavior and thus allowing the individual to exert more personal control.

In an early exposition of his new technique, Freud wrote that "There is, however, another point of view which you may take up in order to understand the psychoanalytic method. The discovery of the unconscious and the introduction of it into consciousness is performed in the face of a continuous resistance on the part of the patient. The process of bringing this unconscious material to light is associated with pain, and because of this pain the patient again and again rejects it". He went on to add that "It is for you then to interpose in this conflict in the patient's mental life. If you succeed in persuading him to accept, by virtue of a better understanding, something that up to now, in consequence of this automatic regulation by pain, he has rejected (repressed), you will then have accomplished something towards his education ... Psychoanalytic treatment may in general be conceived of as such a re-education in overcoming internal resistances".

Primary/secondary gains from illness in resistance
Although the term resistance as it is known today in psychotherapy is largely associated with Sigmund Freud, the idea that some patients "cling to their disease" was a popular one in medicine in the nineteenth century, and referred to patients whose maladies were presumed to persist due to the secondary gains of social, physical, and financial benefits associated with illness. While Freud was trained in what is known as the (secondary) gain from illness that follows a neurosis, he was more interested in the unconscious processes through which he could explain the primary gains that patients derive from their psychiatric symptoms.

The model he devised to do so suggests that the symptoms represent an unconscious tradeoff in exchange for the sufferer being spared other, experientially worse, psychological displeasures, by way of what Freud labeled a compromise formation; "settling the conflict by constructing a symptom is the most convenient way out and the one most agreeable to the pleasure principle".

Thus, contrasting the primary gain (internal benefits) and secondary gain (external benefits) from illness, Freud wrote: "In civil life illness can be used as a screen to gloss over incompetence in one's profession or in competition with other people; while in the family it can serve as a means for the other members and extorting proofs of their love or for imposing one's will upon them ... we sum it up in the term 'gain from illness' ... But there are other motives, that lie still deeper, for holding on to being ill ... [b]ut these cannot be understood without a fresh journey into psychological theory".

Resistance as the product of conflicting agencies
To Freud, the primary gains that stood behind the patient's resistance were the result of an intrapsychic compromise, reached between two or more conflicting agencies: "psychoanalysis ... maintains that the isolation and unconsciousness of this [one] group of ideas have been caused by an active opposition on the part of other groups". Freud called the one psychic agency the "repressing" consciousness, and the other agency, the unconscious, he eventually referred to as the "id".  

The compromise the two competing parties strive for is to achieve maximum drive satisfaction with minimum resultant pain (negative reactions from within and without). Freud theorized that psychopathology was due to unsuccessful compromises – "We have long observed that every neurosis has the result, and therefore probably the purpose, of forcing the patient out of real life, of alienating him from actuality" – as opposed to "successful defense" which resulted in "apparent health".

Key players in the Kompromisslösung theory of symptom production, at the core of Freud's theory of resistance, were: repression (often used interchangeably with the term anticathexis), defense, displeasure, anxiety, danger, compromise, and symptom.  As Freud wrote, "The action undertaken to protect repression is observable in analytic treatment as resistance. Resistance presupposes the existence of what I have called anticathexis."

Forms of resistance 
In 1926, Freud was to alter his view of anxiety, with implications for his view of resistance. "Whereas the old view made it natural to suppose that anxiety arose from the libido belonging to the repressed instinctual impulses, the new one, on the contrary, made the ego the source of anxiety".  

Freud still understood resistance to be intimately bound up with the fact of transference: "It may thus be said that the theory of psycho-analysis is an attempt to account for two observed facts that strike one conspicuously and unexpectedly whenever an attempt is made to trace the symptoms of a neurotic back to their source in his past life: the facts of transference and resistance. Any line of investigation, no matter what its direction, which recognizes these two facts and takes them as the starting-point of its work may call itself psychoanalysis, though it arrives at results other than my own". Indeed, to this day most major schools of psychotherapeutic thought continue to at least recognize, if not "take as the starting-point", the two phenomena of transference and resistance.

Nevertheless his new conceptualisation of the role of anxiety caused him to reframe the phenomena of resistance, to embrace how "The analyst has to combat no less than five kinds of resistance, emanating from three directionsthe ego, the id and the superego". He considered the ego to be the source of three types of resistance: repression, transference and gain from illness, i.e., secondary gain. Freud defined a fourth variety, Id resistance, arising from the id, as resistance that requires "working-through" the product of the repetition compulsion. A fifth, coming from the superego and the last to be discovered, "... seems to originate from the sense of guilt or the need for punishment"i.e., self-sabotage.

All these serve the explicit purpose of defending the ego against feelings of discomfort, for, as Freud wrote: "It is hard for the ego to direct its attention to perceptions and ideas which it has up till now made a rule of avoiding, or to acknowledge as belonging to itself impulses that are the complete opposite of those which it knows as its own."

Repression 

Repression is the form of resistance where the ego pushes offensive memories, ideas, and impulses down into the unconscious. Essentially, the patient is unconsciously hiding memories from the conscious mind.

Transference 

Typically unconscious, transference is when the patient allows past experiences to affect present relationships. In therapy, this may come about if the therapist reminds the patient, either consciously or unconsciously, of someone in their past who may have had an early impact on their life. Subsequently, the patient may suddenly tend to regard the therapist in either a positive or negative manner, depending upon the nature of the past influence.

Ego-resistance 
This form of resistance is a neurotic regression to a proposed state of childlike safety. Usually, it involves the patient's attempts to gain attention and sympathy by emphasizing minor medical symptoms (i.e. headaches, nausea, and depression).

Id resistance 

Id resistance is the opposition put up by the unconscious id against any change in its accustomed patterns of gratification. Id resistance reflects the unconscious desire for consistency in a manner that is based upon the pleasure principle. Since the id is an innate portion of human instinct, interpretation of the conscious is an insufficient method, thus the psychoanalyst must first be able to surmount resistances by the means of deduction of patients' unconscious defenses that are presented through exploitation of the mechanism of transference.

Freud's analysis
As Freud's clinical practice progressed, he noticed how, even when his patients' conscious minds had accepted the existence of, and begun working through their neurotic patterns, they still had to deal with what he called Id resistance: "the resistance of the unconscious...the power of the compulsion to repeat – the attraction exerted by the unconscious prototypes upon the repressed instinctual process".

Later developments
W. R. D. Fairbairn saw id resistance in terms of early attachment to an internalised bad object, so that the individual remained bound by ties of yearning towards, and anger at rejection by, the repudiating parent of childhood.

Id resistance manifests itself in group therapy in three main psychosexual forms: oral-level id resistance might take the form of an obsequious dependence on the therapist's words, or alternatively express hostility in cutting, biting remarks; anal hostility can be displayed in dumping material indiscriminately on the therapist; and phallic-level id resistance appears in the form of competition with, and/or seductive ploys towards, therapist and other group members. Acting out and acting in of id resistances in group therapy need to be contained by an emphasis on words as the central means of therapeutic interaction.

Eric Berne saw personality in terms of a life-script laid down in early childhood, and considered that the main obstacle to recovery in therapy "is the pull of the script, something like the Id resistance of Freud".

Superego resistance 
Superego resistance is the opposition put up in therapy against recovery by the patient's conscience, their sense of underlying guilt. It prompts personal punishment by the means of self-sabotage or self-imposed impediment. It has been considered by some (though not by Freud) the weakest form of resistance, reflecting the moralistic sentiments of the superego.

Freud's late formulation
Freud in the twenties came belatedly to the realisation of the importance of an 'unconscious morality' in opposing his therapeutic aims. Thereupon he divided the sources of resistance into five, pointing out that "The fifth, coming from the super-ego and the last to be discovered…seems to originate from the sense of guilt or need for punishment".   However he also pointed out how often the patient does not feel guilty so much as unwell, when their superego resistance is in operation.

Subsequent developments
Object relations theory tended to see superego resistance in terms of a patient's relationship with an internalised critical/persecutory parent figure. Reluctance to end the 'security' of the bond to the internalised parent strengthens the superego resistance. Where the ego ideal is harshly perfectionist, or represents an internalised mother who idealised suffering over enjoyment, superego resistance takes the form of a refusal to be 'corrupted' by the progress of the therapy.

In group therapy, superego resistance may be externalised or internalised.  In the first case, a moralistic sub-group may form, which is hypercritical of other, less conformist members; while in the second case (of internalisation), the severity of the inward conscience, and the need for punishment, may lead to action destructive to the self and to the progress of the treatment.

Freud's treatment of resistance 
Freud viewed all five categories of resistance as requiring more than just intellectual insight or understanding to overcome.  Instead he favored a slow process of working through.

Working through allows patients "... to get to know this resistance" and "... discover the repressed instinctual trends which are feeding the resistance" and it is this experientially convincing process that "distinguishes analytic treatment from every kind of suggestive treatment". For this reason Freud insisted that therapists remain neutral, saying only as much as "is absolutely necessary to keep him [the patient] talking", so that resistance could be seen as clearly as possible in patients' transference, and become obvious to the patients themselves. The inextricable link suggested by Freud between transference and resistance perhaps encapsulates his legacy to psychotherapy.

Applications 
Psychoanalysis is, altogether, considered to be a type of insight-oriented therapeutic program. Despite general initial reservations, these types of programs have since transitioned from being quite marginal to becoming more well-known and mainstream. In consideration to the theory of resistance itself, within a clinical setting, the expression of resistance is considered to be a significant stage to recovery because it reveals the presence of repression. Additionally, it is indicative of progress in the effort of resolving any underlying issues that may be the cause of personal dysfunction. As resistance is theorized to be a manifestation of  the unconscious mind's attempts to protect the ego, it is the task of the psychoanalyst to combat this opposition by directing the patient to confront the unacceptable desires or uncomfortable memories. By this course of action, the patient may reach a cathartic conclusion.

Criticisms 

Steve de Shazer, under a relativist, postmodern psychology model, declared Resistance dead.

Psychoanalysts and their critics remain divided with regard to the concept of resistance. Since Freud first developed his theory of resistance, he has been significantly criticized for using personally favorable and unfalsifiable theory, among other problems. For example, if a patient were to agree with a psychoanalyst's inference about themselves, it is a confirmation that there is something they are repressing; however, if the patient disagrees, it is also a sign they are engaged in repression, which means the psychoanalyst is correct in either scenario (see also: Gaslighting, Kafkatrap). Additionally, some relational psychoanalysts believe that the success of psychoanalysis is not due its various explanatory systems or its reasoning about repression, but rather simply due to the process of interpersonal communication.

References

Further reading 
Bischoff, M. M. (1997). "Predictors of client resistance in the counseling interaction". Unpublished doctoral dissertation, University of Illinois, Urbana-Champaign.
Freud, S. & Breuer, J. (1959). "On the psychical mechanism of hysterical phenomena". In E. Jones (Ed.) & J. Riviere (Trans.) Collected Papers (Vol. 1, pp. 24–41). New York: Basic Books. (Original work published in 1893.)
Freud, S. (1959). "The defense neuro-psychoses". In E. Jones (Ed.) & J. Riviere (Trans.) Collected Papers (Vol. 1, pp. 59–75). New York: Basic Books. (Original work published in 1894.)
Freud, S. (1959). "An autobiographical study". In J. Strachey (Ed. & Trans.) The standard edition of the complete psychological works of Sigmund Freud (Vol. 20, pp. 7–70). London: Hogarth Press. (Original work published in 1925.)
Freud, S. (1959). "Constructions in analysis". In E. Jones (Ed.) & J. Riviere (Trans.) Collected Papers (Vol. 5, pp. 358–371). New York: Basic Books. (Original work published in 1937.)
Gabbard, G. O. (2001). "Psychoanalysis and psychoanalytic psychotherapy". In W. J. Livesley (Ed.), Handbook of personality disorders: Theory, research, and treatment. New York: Guilford Press.
Hergenhahn, B. R., & Olson, M. H. (2003). An introduction to theories of personality (6th ed.). Upper Saddle River, NJ: Prentice Hall.
Phares, E.J., & Chaplin, W.F. (1997). "Psychoanalytic theory: The Freudian revolution, dissent, and revision". Introduction to personality, 4th ed. Addison-Wesley.
Popper, K. R. (1992). Realism and the aim of science. New York: Routledge. (Original work published in 1956)
Turkat, I. D. & Meyer, V. (1982). "The behavior-analytic approach". In P. L. Wachtel (Ed.) Resistance: Psychodynamic and behavioral approaches. New York: Plenum Press.
Winston, B., Samstag, L. W., Winston, A., & Muran, J. C. (1994). "Patient defense/therapist interventions". Psychotherapy: Theory, research, practice, training, 31(3), pp. 478–491.

Psychodynamics
Psychoanalytic terminology
Freudian psychology